Flatosoma is a genus of planthoppers in the family Flatidae. It was first described by Leopold Melichar in 1901. Species in the genus are found in Sabah, Malaysia.

Species
FLOW lists the following species (which may have been originally placed in the genus Paraflata):
 Flatosoma diastola (Schmidt, 1909)
 Flatosoma signoreti (Melichar, 1901)

References 

Flatidae
Auchenorrhyncha genera
Insects of Malaysia